The Climbers is a 2019 Chinese adventure drama film directed by Daniel Lee and written by Alai. The film stars Wu Jing, Zhang Ziyi, Zhang Yi, Jing Boran, and Hu Ge. The film tells the real-life expedition of two generations of Chinese mountaineers to ascend Mount Everest from the perilous north side in 1960 and 1975. The film released in China, the United Kingdom and North America on September 30, 2019.

Cast 
 Wu Jing as Fang Wuzhou (based on Wang Fuzhou)
 Zhang Ziyi as Xu Ying
 Zhang Yi as Qu Songlin
 Jing Boran as Li Guoliang
 Hu Ge as Yang Guang (based on Xia Boyu)
 Jackie Chan as old Yang Guang
 Wang Jingchun as Zhao Chun
 Chen Long as Lin Jie
 He Lin as Zhao Hong
 Choenyi Tsering as Hei Mudan
 Liu Xiaofeng as Xu Haotian 
 Tobgyal as a Tibetan Buddhist monk
 Lawang Lop as Jiebu (based on Gongbu)

Production
Before the film was filmed, actor Wu Jing conducted a half-month cold tolerance training in Mount Gangshka, Menyuan Hui Autonomous County, Qinghai Province.

Production started in February 2019 and ended in late April 2019. Most of the film was shot on location in southwest China's Tibet Autonomous Region.

On February 16, 2019, actress Zhang Ziyi announced on Sina Weibo that Wu Jing, Zhang Yi, Jing Boran and He Lin had joined the cast. On March 1, Hu Ge and Jackie Chan joined the cast, and Zhang Ziyi would play a meteorologist.

Release
The first poster was released on August 29, 2019, and the first official trailer was released on September 10, 2019.
The film premiered at the 2019 Cannes Film Festival on May 17, 2019, and it was slated for release in China, the UK and North America on September 30, 2019.

Reception
The Climbers grossed about 400 million yuan on its third day of screening. The film earned more than 761 million yuan on its opening weekend. The film's overall rating on Douban was a 6.5 out of 10 as of October 2019.

References

External links
 
 
 The Climbers at rottentomatoes.com

2019 films
2010s Mandarin-language films
2010s adventure drama films
Chinese adventure drama films
Films shot in Tibet
Films about Tibet
2019 drama films